Pierre-Joseph Tiolier (17 March 1763 – 27 June 1819) was a French engraver who was appointed the 15th Engraver-General of France.

Early years

Pierre-Joseph Tiolier was born of French parents in London, England on 17 March 1763, the youngest of at least fourteen children.
His family originated in Auvergne and included lawyers, businessmen, doctors, clergymen and civil servants.
His father, Joseph Tiolier of Cournon, Auvergne was established as a master confectioner in Lons-le-Saunier in 1840.
Pierre-Joseph Tiolier was taught by his brother-in-law, Pierre-Simon-Benjamin Duvivier.

Career

Tiolier was appointed controller of coins at the Paris Mint on 24 Frimaire year IV (14 December 1795).
He was named Engraver-General of France by Napoleon, the First Consul, on 11 Germinal year XI (1 April 1803).
In 1816 he resigned his position in favor of his son, Nicolas-Pierre Tiolier (1784–1853).
In 1817 he was commissioned by the scientist James Smithson to make a bust medallion, which showed Smithson in profile.
Pierre-Joseph Tiolier died in 1819.

Work
Coins include:
 5 Francs Bonaparte First consul (year XI et XII)
 5 Francs Napoléon Emperor of the French Empire (1809–1815)
 5 Francs Louis XVIII of France (1814–1815)

References

Sources

External links
 

1763 births
1819 deaths
French engravers
French medallists